The Castello Roganzuolo Altarpiece, Castello Roganzuolo Polyptych or Madonna and Child with Saint Peter and Saint Paul is a painting by Titian, commissioned in 1543 by the leading citizens of Castello Roganzuolo, Province of Treviso, Veneto, Italy.  It is now in the Albino Luciani Diocesan Museum in Vittorio Veneto.

The painting is a triptych with three narrow round-topped sections holding the standing figures, which was by then a rather old-fashioned format.

History
All records of payment to the artist (including building a villa for the artist on Col di Manza) survive in the parish accounts. It was completed and installed on the high altar of the church of St Peter and St Paul in the town in 1549, under a set of 1530s frescoes by the local painter Francesco da Milano.

During the First World War the area was invaded by the Austrian Empire and monsignor Giovanni Pizzinato, the town's parish priest, hid the work from them in the church's attic - he was interrogated and arrested but did not reveal its hiding place. The humidity in the attic damaged it colours and it was rediscovered after the war in poor condition. Badly restored, it was moved to the Diocesan Museum. Much of the work is irretrievably damaged and its fourth cymatium panel showing the dead Christ with angels is still lost. A copy of all four panels now stands in the church, in the original elaborate frame.

Note

Bibliography
Image of the copy of the painting

 
 
  
Tagliaferro G., La pala di Serravalle e la congiuntura degli anni '40 (publication on the Ca' Foscari site).

Religious paintings by Titian
1549 paintings
Altarpieces